Harcharan Bains is a freelance journalist, political ideologue, writer and former TV sports commentator. Bains is the General Secretary of India's oldest regional political party Shiromani Akali Dal (Badal). Bains is currently advisor to Chief Minister of Punjab Parkash Singh Badal on national affairs and media.  
  
Bains has written on Punjab and Sikh politics, and has been adviser to two chief ministers - Surjit Singh Barnala ( 1985-1987) and Badal (since 1997). He was an assistant professor of English literature at Punjab Agricultural University, Ludhiana, when Barnala made him an advisor.

References

Living people
Punjabi people
Shiromani Akali Dal politicians
1951 births